= U.S. Representative (disambiguation) =

A U.S. representative represents the United States or is a representative to the United States.

U.S. representative may refer to:

- a member of the U.S. House of Representatives, who is colloquially called a "U.S. representative", a "member of the House", or a "U.S. congressman".
- The U.S. trade representative
